Hyacinth Menik Kanthi Kurukulasuriya (born 22 October 1957), popularly as Menik Kurukulasuriya, is an actress in Sri Lankan cinema.

Personal life
She was born as the youngest of the family. Her father was Kurukulasuriyage Venus Anthony Fernando. Kurukualsuriya studied at Good Shepherd Convent, Panadura, All Saints Balika Borella and St. Paul’s Girls School, Milagiriya. 

She has three elder sisters - Jeevarani, Shirani and Janaki, all are actresses. She also has one brother, Vivek, who currently lives in Austarlia. Shirani got the opportunity to act with Jeevarani in the film Ranmuthu Duwa. Janaki got the opportunity to play with sister in the film Sasaraka Hati.

Jeevarani is married to Lanka Wijeratne, who is a doctor. They married in 1968. They moved to Australia after spending five years of marriage in Sri Lanka. The couple has three daughters - Sajeewani, Senani and Lankangani. Elder daughter, Sanjeewani is a nutritionist and a first-class singer. Younger daughters are doctors. Lankangani is married to entrepreneur Nalaka Edirisinghe. Nalaka is the son of media personality Soma Edirisinghe. Senani is also a singer and released her first solo track in 2016.

Career
At first she never intended to become an actress like her elder sisters. Nonetheless Menik followed in their path after being elected Goya Beauty Queen in 1971.

Kurukuasuriya made her debut in Dharmasena Pathiraja's 1973 film Ahas Gauwa playing Amarasiri Kalansuriya's sister.

Filmography

Film

References

External links
Menik Kurukulasuriya in Sinhala Cinema Database

Sri Lankan film actresses
Living people
20th-century Sri Lankan actresses
Place of birth missing (living people)
1957 births